The 2003 Kwara State gubernatorial election occurred in Nigeria on April 19, 2003. The PDP nominee Bukola Saraki won the election, defeating Mohammed Lawal of the All Nigeria Peoples Party.

Bukola Saraki emerged PDP candidate. He picked Joen Afolabi Ogundeji as his running mate. Mohammed Lawal was the ANPP candidate with Simeon A.S. as his running mate.

Electoral system
The Governor of Kwara State is elected using the plurality voting system.

Primary election

PDP primary
The PDP primary election was won by Bukola Saraki. He picked Joen Afolabi Ogundeji as his running mate.

ANPP primary
The ANPP primary election was won by Mohammed Lawal. He picked Simeon A.S. as his running mate.

Results
A total number of 8 candidates registered with the Independent National Electoral Commission to contest in the election.

The total number of registered voters in the state was 995,882. Total number of votes cast was 628,020, while number of valid votes was 589,940. Rejected votes were 38,080.

References 

Kwara State gubernatorial elections
Kwara State gubernatorial election
Kwara State gubernatorial election
Kwara State gubernatorial election